Anucharan Murugaiyan is an Indian director, writer and editor who works in Tamil cinema. He made his directorial debut in Australia with the short film Infinity (2011) released in Australia and got his breakthrough in feature films with Kirumi, which has critically acclaimed and featured in 19th Annual Toronto Reel Asian International Film Festival.

Early life
He did his bachelor's degree in Mechanical Engineering at Coimbatore Institute of Technology . He is a design engineer by profession and has done a job at TCS Kolkata for about 18 months. Then he travelled to Australia to pursue his master's degree in Animation Technology at Sydney. He joined Animation mentor course in Sydney the masters in the field of animation where he learned from renowned including people from Pixar and ILM.

Film career
Anucharan, a director of several short films, 20 music videos and 10 television shows in Australia. 
He has reached to the semi – finals with his short film "Infinity" at the Trop Fest (World's largest short film festival) in Sydney. He had come to Chennai for his sister's wedding, when M. Manikandan, the director of Kaaka Muttai and a close friend of him, and composer G. V. Prakash Kumar, encouraged him to make a Tamil film, after hearing the script of Kirumi. Manikandan introduced Anucharan to Jayaraman, a former assistant, who had worked with actor Rajinikanth for 24 years and who decided to produce the venture along with his friends Prithiviraj and Rajendran as he liked the script since it was "contemporary" and had a message for society.

Filmography

Television

Short films
 Infinity - It reached semi-finals at TropFest, Sydney
 Watch Dog

Awards

 His debut movie "Kirumi" won the Best Film award in 13th Chennai International Film Festival
 Behindwoods Gold Medals (2017) - "Best Screenplay Writer" for the movie Aandavan Kattalai

References

External links
 

Living people
Film directors from Tamil Nadu
Indian male screenwriters
Tamil film directors
Tamil screenwriters
Television editors
Australian television directors
Year of birth missing (living people)
Tamil-language film directors